Peeping Tom is an 1897 American short comedy-drama film. The film was made by the American Mutoscope Company. It concerns a man peeping through a keyhole at an attractive young woman and his comeuppance.

This film is frequently confused online with the 1901 film Par Le Trou De La Serrure (What is Seen Through the Keyhole), directed by Ferdinand Zecca.

See also
 What the Butler Saw (mutoscope)

References

External links
 

1897 films
1890s American films
American silent short films
American black-and-white films
1897 comedy films
1890s comedy-drama films
1897 short films
Silent American comedy-drama films